Andrew Pearce (born 20 April 1966) is an English former professional footballer who played as a defender. 

As a player he notably played in the Premier League for Coventry City, Sheffield Wednesday and  Wimbledon, as well as non-league sides Halesowen Town and Aldershot Town

Playing career
He spent his career in England, starting at Halesowen Town, then moved to Coventry City and, after three seasons at Highfield Road moved to Sheffield Wednesday where he achieved cult status following his goal against Sheffield United in a memorable 3–1 victory at Hillsborough. He also helped them reach the semi-finals of the Football League Cup in the 1993-94 season, when they also finished seventh in the FA Premier League.

In November 1995, he moved to Wimbledon for £600,000 but played just seven times for them in the 1995-96 season and was never selected for the first team again after that season, although he remained on the club's payroll for a further three seasons before he was finally given a free transfer. He completed his playing career with a two-year spell in the Isthmian League with Aldershot Town before finally retiring as a player in 2001.

References

1966 births
Living people
English footballers
Halesowen Town F.C. players
Coventry City F.C. players
Sheffield Wednesday F.C. players
Wimbledon F.C. players
Aldershot Town F.C. players
Premier League players
People from Bradford-on-Avon
Association football defenders